Our Lady of Medjugorje, also called Queen of Peace and Mother of the Redeemer, is the title given to visions of Mary, the mother of Jesus, which began in 1981 to six Herzegovinian Croat teenagers in Medjugorje, Bosnia and Herzegovina (at the time in SFR Yugoslavia). The alleged visionaries are Ivan Dragičević, Ivanka Ivanković, Jakov Čolo, Marija Pavlović, Mirjana Dragičević and Vicka Ivanković. They ranged from ten to sixteen years old at the time of the first apparition.

There have also been continued reports of the visionaries seeing and receiving messages from the apparition of Our Lady during the years since. The seers often refer to the apparition as the "", which is a Croatian archaism for lady. On 13 May 2017, Pope Francis declared that the original visions reported by the teenagers are worth studying in more depth, while the subsequently continued visions over the years are, in his view, of dubious value. As a pastoral initiative, after considering the considerable number of people who go to Medjugorje and the abundant "fruits of grace" that have sprung from it, the ban on officially organized pilgrimages was lifted by the Pope in May 2019. This was made official with the celebration of a youth festival among pilgrims and Catholic clergy in Medjugorie for five days in August 2019. However, this was not to be interpreted as an authentication of known events, which still require examination by the Church. Clerics and the faithful are not permitted to participate in meetings, conferences or public celebrations during which the credibility of such apparitions would be taken for granted.

Background

Political situation

At the time of the apparitions, the village of Medjugorje was in Bosnia and Herzegovina, part of the Socialist Federal Republic of Yugoslavia, a federation of various Slavic nations. There were tensions among the nations, exacerbated by religious difference: most Croats are Catholic, most Serbs are Eastern Orthodox, while the Bosnians and Herzegovinians are a mix of the two and included a third group – the Bosnian Muslims. The death of President Josip Broz Tito in early May 1980 had led to anti-communist backlash and the build up of ethnic tensions, destabilizing the country. Yugoslavia was moving towards political, economic, and national collapse. The political crisis generated the economic one and the public debt soared. The Albanian anti-Serb riots in Kosovo in 1981 were an example of national dissatisfaction. After Tito's death, the security apparatus enhanced its activities against the perceived "enemies of the state", especially in Bosnia and Herzegovina, where the apparatus was most loyal to Tito. Such activity was especially oriented towards the Catholic Church in Herzegovina.

In addition, the election of the Pope John Paul II from the communist Poland and the Catholic Solidarity Movement intensified the conflict between the Vatican and the Soviet-dominated Eastern Europe.

In the 1980s there was a boom of Marian apparitions in Europe, especially in Ireland and Italy. Chris Maunder connects these apparitions, including those in Medjugorje, with the anti-communist movement in Eastern Europe that led to the downfall of communism.

Religious situation

The Franciscan Province of Herzegovina was established in 1843 when it seceded from the Franciscan Province of Bosna Srebrena. In 1846, the Holy See established the Apostolic Vicariate of Herzegovina, which was then part of the Ottoman Empire and it was considered to be a mission area. The first vicars were all Franciscans. In 1881, the area came under the control of the Austro-Hungarian Empire and Pope Leo XIII took steps to establish dioceses and appoint local bishops. As part of re-establishing normal church structures, the bishops worked to transfer parishes from the Franciscans to the diocesan clergy. The Apostolic Vicariate was elevated to the Diocese of Mostar-Duvno, which included Medjugorje.

The Franciscans of Herzegovina saw this as a threat, depriving them of a source of income and their role as community social leaders which they attained over centuries of “difficult missionary” work while under Turkish domination.

A jurisdictional conflict arose, known as the Herzegovina Affair or Herzegovina Case which dates back to 1923, when Rome made a decision to have the Franciscans turn over half of the parishes they control to the secular clergy. A smooth transition was inhibited by both a lack of sufficient diocesan clergy and by the resistance of the friars to the divestment of their parishes. The Franciscans complied only partially and have refused to comply with Rome's decisions ever since. Their resistance to this change put them into conflict with the Church's hierarchy, including their Franciscan Order in Rome. Their resistance to comply was against both church authority and canon law.

In 1933 Pope Pius XI requested the whole Catholic world to erect crosses on the dominant mountains in honor of the 1900th anniversary of the crucifixion of Jesus. In 1933 a massive cross was erected by the local Catholic diocese on a mountain near Medjuorje. The 1,770-foot peak was originally named Mount Sipovac but the locals changed the name to Mount Krizevac which means “Mount of the Cross.” They constructed the 33-foot-high cross weighing fifteen tons in six weeks, carrying all the building materials on their backs.

In 1975, Pope Paul VI, Romanis Pontificibus, decreed that the Franciscans must withdraw from most of the parishes in the Diocese of Mostar-Duvno, retaining 30 and leaving 52 to the diocesan clergy. In the 1980s the Franciscans still held 40 parishes under the direction of 80 friars. In August 1980, the new bishop of Mostar, Pavao Zanic immediately announced that only one quarter of the city would remain under the Franciscans.
The Mostar Cathedral of Mary, Mother of the Church was completed in the summer of 1980.

According to Michael Budde in his book Beyond the Borders of Baptism Catholicity, Allegiances, and Lived Identities, as it gained a national and international reputation, the Medjugorje pilgrimage site became a formidable symbol of the power of religion in the fight against the Communist Yugoslav regime.

Initial events 

On 24 June 1981 around 6:30pm, fifteen-year-old Ivanka Ivanković and her friend, a sixteen-year-old, Mirjana Dragičević, were on a walk to talk and have a smoke. Ivanka was startled to notice the shimmering silhouette of a woman bathed in a brilliant light on nearby Mount Podbrdo. She immediately said, “Mirjana, look, it’s Gospa!” (Our Lady) She brought this to Marijana's attention, but Marija scoffed at the idea and they continued on their way. They then met Milka Pavlovic, 13, who asked them to help bring in the sheep, so the three returned to the nearby hill, where all three saw the apparition. They were then joined by their friend Vicka Ivanković, 17, who saw the Gospa and was so frightened, she ran down the hill. Driven by curiosity, she returned with Ivan Dragičević, 16, and Ivan Ivankovic, 20 who were picking apples. Ivan Dragičević was so frightened that he dropped his apples and bolted. Later they said they all saw the same apparition. "The Medjugorje visions began only days after Orthodox Serbs commemorated the 40th anniversary of mass killings of Serbs by the Ustaše at Šurmanci during the Second World War."

The next day Ivanka Ivankovic, Mirjana Dragicevic, Vicka Ivankovic, and Ivan Dragicevic returned to the site. Ivan Ivankovic did not accompany them. As Milka Pavlovic's mother kept her home to help in the garden, Vicka Ivankovic brought along Milka's sister, Marija Pavlovic, and ten-year-old Jakov Colo. Milka experienced no further apparitions. The six seers told the Franciscan friar Father Jozo Zovko, who was the parish priest at St. James Church in Medjugorje, that they had seen the Virgin Mary (Gospa). He was initially skeptical. He noticed that the seers became agitated if anyone hinted that were lying and he was taken by the fact that their physical descriptions of the Gospa were consistent with each other. According to Randall Sullivan, they described her as "...a young woman about twenty years old, they said, with blue eyes, black hair, and a crown of stars around Her head; She wore a white veil and bluish-grey robe. Each of the children said they had not been able to see the Virgin's feet, described Her as hovering just above the ground on a white cloud, and said she spoke in a singing voice." In early July, pastor Jozo Zovko rejected his initial skepticism and embraced the apparitions.

The Mostar Cathedral of Mary, Mother of the Church was completed in the summer of 1980. In order to create the cathedral parish it was decided to split the parish of SS. Peter and Paul. The Franciscans objected to this as being unfair. Friars Ivica Vego and Ivan Prusina, were chaplains in the parish of SS Peter and Paul in Mostar, who refused to obey the Papal decree Romanis Pontificibus and relocate from the parish. After several warnings, Bishop Žanić suspended their priestly faculties throughout the dioceses under his jurisdiction.
Yugoslav officials condemned the reports as "clerical-nationalist" conspiracy on the part of Croat extremists. Bishop Žanić took a stand for the seers and the local Franciscans against the communist authorities who tried to prosecute them. He informed the Pope about the events in September 1981.

Vicka allegedly received messages from the Madonna from 19 December 1981 until 29 September 1982, and recorded them in her diary. On 21 September Fr. Ivan Prusina, along with other Franciscans, with the help of the crowd, violently expelled diocesan priests from the parish.

On 15 January 1982, the bishop invited the alleged seers to his residence to ask them if there were any messages from the Madonna on the issue, and they replied that there were not. However, on 3 April 1982, the seers came to the bishop to tell him that the Madonna scolded them for not telling the truth and that she requested that the two friars remain in Mostar and continue to celebrate mass and hear confessions. The Madonna allegedly told Vicka that Fr. Ivan Prusina and Fr. Ivica Vego "are not guilty of anything" in the matter. Tomislav Vlašić took responsibility for the lies of the seers telling the bishop he instructed them not to tell the truth because the bishop might dispute the authenticity of the apparitions.

On 21 June 1983, one of the seers, Ivan Dragičević, sent a threatening message allegedly from the Madonna to the bishop, in which she requests the bishop's conversion regarding her apparitions, otherwise, he would be "judged by me and my son Jesus.” On 6 February 1985, Ivan Dragičević sent somewhat more tolerant message from the Madonna, with her stating that if he doesn't believe in her apparitions, at least he shouldn't persecute her priests who believe in her messages and promote them.”

In the opinion of Peter Jan Margry's, the deviancy of such reported Marian apparitions is observed in their formal espousing of Catholic teachings, and obedience to the Church and the Pope, while in practice, they consider the messages to be authentic revelations, have connections to excommunicated priests, and disobey the Church and the Pope.

The Archbishop of Split-Makarska Frane Franić, who supported the alleged apparitions from the beginning, tried to persuade Vicka to retract the messages about the two friars, so the authenticity of the apparitions could be defended more easily. However, both Vicka and Ivan continued to claim that the messages regarding the two friars were from the Madonna. The messages included the accusations against Bishop Pavao Žanić and encouragement for the two friars not to leave the parish. It was then when Bishop Pavao took his final negative stance on the alleged apparitions.

The whole of that time, the Bishop remained cautious towards the apparitions, without any final conclusion. He became skeptical towards the apparitions after the apparition accused him of the disorder in Herzegovina that existed between the Franciscans and the diocesan clergy and defended the two Franciscans who refused to leave their parishes as requested by the Papal decree Romanis Pontificibus.

Because of his disobedience, Fr. Ivan Prusina had his priestly jurisdiction revoked by Bishop Pavao Žanić on 9 October 1980. Fr. Ivan Prusina and Fr. Ivica Vego appealed to the Franciscan Order and the Congregation for Clergy, who declined their appeal considering the decisions to be final. However, the Apostolic Signatura, the highest judicial court of the Holy See, concluded on 27 March 1993 that they had a right on appeal and saw this as a violation of the procedure and declared the dismissal to be null and void; the same followed for Fr. Ivica Vego as well. The Franciscan Province of Herzegovina tried to present this as a sign of victory against the bishop, however, the bishop's revocation of Fr. Ivan Prusina's priestly jurisdiction remained in force, and the Apostolic Signature never reviewed the matter itself, only the procedural defects. It later became known that Fr. Ivica Vego had impregnated a nun, whom he eventually married and lives with her near Medjugorje. Velikonja wrote that it "would not have succeeded had it not been for the rich and long religious tradition of the region."

Government response
In 1982, the communist authorities changed their stance towards the Medjugorje phenomenon and no longer observed the event as political, but as an economic benefit. In the winter of 1983, the authorities started to promote religious tourism. In 1983 the state-owned publishing house, A. G. Matos published the book The Madonna's apparitions in Medjugorje (Croatian: Gospina ukazanja u Međugorju) by Ljudevit Rupčić's, who was a theologian and Herzegovinian Franciscan loyal to Medjugorje. The state-owned tourist agencies also started offering their services to the Medjugorje pilgrims in 1984. The Yugoslav state-owned aviation company, Jat Airways, introduced special lines for the pilgrims from Italy. From the mid-1980s, the Yugoslav media also became supportive of the Medjugorje phenomenon, emphasizing its economic aspects.

Local Catholic Church response

Pavao Žanić 

Initially, Bishop Žanić defended the seers and the possibility of Our Lady appearing to them, although not endorsing the visions themselves. He informed the Pope about the events on 6 September 1981. Žanić set up a commission of inquiry and prepared to forward its results to Rome. However, apparitions continued, and messages from Our Lady piled up. In time, it became clear that Our Lady sided with the disobedient Franciscans against the bishop. According to Vicka's diaries, Our Lady was consulted several times on the situation of Franciscan priests who were ordered to hand over the administration of the parishes in Mostar. Our Lady reportedly replied that the bishop was to blame for the whole situation and that the Franciscan priests should continue their mission. Žanić saw in this proof that the seers had been manipulated and that the apparitions were false.

He soon began to speak publicly about his doubts. In 1983, Žanić received a letter from one of the visionaries, Ivan Dragičević, stating that Our Lady "sends a penultimate warning to the bishop" and further stating that "if he does not address or correct himself, he will be tried by my court and the court of my son Jesus." Žanić was stunned, so he forwarded the letter to the Vatican the same day. He said that "the issue was resolved" for him. Since Žanić led the process of parish reorganization, he considered the apparitions to be a Franciscan fabrication in order to damage his reputation in the diocese. Such a message from Our Lady was proof to him that he was right. The Franciscans used the pilgrimages to their advantage, but at the same time claimed that the apparitions took place spontaneously at the initiative of Our Lady.

In 1984, Žanić published a statement in which he disputed the authenticity of the events in Medjugorje, denouncing the Franciscans who promoted apparitions. More specifically, Žanić warned that Tomislav Vlašić, a priest in Medjugorje who was the spiritual father of seers, was a "manipulator and deceiver". Žanić was especially critical of Vlašić, who became the spiritual director of the alleged seers and whose sexual scandal wasn't public yet.
Two years later, Žanić sent a report to the Congregation for the Doctrine of the Faith, which was then led by Joseph Ratzinger, claiming that the Medjugorje apparitions were not authentic.

Žanić publicly called for the abolition of pilgrimages in the church organization, and the Vatican supported him. However, the Vatican expressed the view that individual pilgrimages should be provided with pastoral care and access to the sacraments.

However, Žanić was unable to prevent public opinion in the Catholic world regarding Medjugorje, which has already become a global phenomenon. Proponents of the apparition rejected the bishop's authority and felt that the bishop had overlooked divine intervention for personal reasons, so the 1985 commission's negative decision on the apparitions was ignored. The Vatican did not come to Žanić's aid, but remained silent, leading to speculation about the Pope's support for Medjugorje. It is likely that Pope John Paul II somewhat favored Medjugorje behind the scenes, given that Medjugorje was appropriate for Vatican foreign policy during the 1980s. Namely, at that time, the Vatican was providing support to the United States in overthrowing the communist bloc in Eastern Europe.

Although Medjugorje supporters sought to characterize Žanić as a stubborn and unjust critic, a person easy to ignore, in 1991, the Yugoslav Bishops' Conference decided, declaring that "based on previous research, it is not possible to determine the supernatural character of the apparitions" in Medjugorje.

Ratko Perić 

Ratko Perić, who succeeded Žanić in 1993, remained as hostile towards the apparitions as his predecessor. Perić published two books on the Virgin Mary arguing his opposition to the Medjugorje phenomenon. He exclaimed his personal opinion that not only that the supernatural origin of the apparitions wasn't established, but that the nonsupernatural has been established, a more negative judgment than that of the Yugoslav bishops' conference of 1991.

Petar Palić 

Petar Palić succeeded Perić in 2020. So far, Palić hasn't made position on Medjugorje public. However, a report from Deutsche Welle stated that Palić holds similar views as his predecessor Perić.

Commissions investigating Medjugorje

First diocesan commission, 1982–1984 

In January 1982, Žanić established the first of two commissions for the investigation of the apparitions. The first commission was made up of four members of the Ecclesiastical Authority and was active from 1982 to 1984. The diocesan commission formed in 1982 and reconstituted in 1984 made a negative conclusion on the apparitions in 1985 that the supernatural was not established.

Second diocesan commission, 1984–1986 

In February 1984, Žanić expanded the initial commission to fifteen members. It included nine professors from various theological faculties and two psychiatrists. The second commission examined Fr. Tomislav Vlašić's Chronicles and Vicka's diaries. The Chronicles and diaries were found to be non-credible, with records kept irregularly, entered subsequently, and some parts of Vicka's diaries forged. The commission asked Vlašić to hand over the Chronicle, which Vlašić did, but only with a long delay and after modifying the Chronicle. In May 1986, the Commission declared that it could not establish that the events in Medjugorje were of a supernatural character.

Yugoslav National Conference of Bishops, 1987–1991 

In January 1987 the Congregation for the Doctrine of the Faith removed the matter from the local bishop and placed the decision into the hands of the Yugoslav National Conference of Bishops who created a new enquiry. The Bishops conference agreed with the second commission and ruled "non constat de supernaturalitate,” stating in April 1991 that, it cannot be confirmed that supernatural apparitions and revelations are occurring and would leave that decision to a future date. The Conference had instructed that pilgrimages should not be organized to Medjugorje on the supposition of its being supernatural. In its statement the commission made note that since many pilgrims come to Medjugorje from all over the world and these people need pastoral care and guidance. The Vatican made it clear that the bishops were not allowed to organize pilgrimages but they could join them.

Bishop Žanić retired in 1993 and his replacement, Bishop Peric's, expressed his own personal opinion that the visions of Medjugorje were constat de non supernaturalitate (it is not of a supernatural nature).

Ruini Commission - the international Vatican Commission, 2010–2014 

In 2010, an international Vatican commission was set up by Pope Benedict XVI to study Medjugorje.
The Holy See announced that it had established a commission, headed by Cardinal Camillo Ruini, to examine the Medjugorje phenomenon. Other prominent members of the commission included Cardinals Jozef Tomko, Vinko Puljić, Josip Bozanić, Julián Herranz and Angelo Amato, as well as psychologists, theologians, mariologists, and canonists. The commission was established to "collect and examine all the material,” and publish a "detailed report" based on its findings. It was tasked to evaluate the alleged apparitions and to make appropriate pastoral recommendations for those pilgrims who continued to go to Medjugorje despite the ban on official pilgrimages. The commission was active until 17 January 2014.

The Ruini Commission made a distinction between the first appearances from 24 June 1981 until 3 July 1981, with reportedly 13 votes in favor of those apparitions being of "supernatural" origin, one vote against, and an expert with a suspensive vote. According to Andrea Tornielli, the commission noted that "the seers were caught by surprise by the apparition, and that nothing of what they had seen was influenced by either the Franciscans of the parish or any other subjects. They showed resistance in telling what happened despite being arrested by the police and death threatened them. The commission also rejected the hypothesis of a demonic origin of the apparitions." Regarding the rest of the apparitions, the commission found them to be influenced by heavy interference caused by the conflict between the Franciscans of the parish and the bishop. The commission deemed later visions to be "pre-announced and programmed", and they continued despite the seers stating they would end.

Also, the Commission found that there were no miraculous healings connected to the apparitions in Medjugorje.

Regarding the pastoral fruits of Medjugorje, the commission voted in two phases. Firstly they focused on the spiritual fruits of Medjugorje but putting aside the behaviors of the seers. They voted six in favor of the positive outcome, seven stating they are mixed with most being positive, and the other three experts stating the fruits are a mix of positive and negative. In the second phase, taking into consideration the behavior of the seers, twelve members stated that they could not express their opinion, and the other two members voted against the supernatural origin of the phenomenon.

The commission endorsed the end of the ban on pilgrimages organized in Medjugorje. Cindy Wooden wrote that the commission recommended that the Pope "designate the town's parish Church of St. James as a pontifical shrine with Vatican oversight."

The Ruini Report was completed in 2014 and was received by Pope Francis. After examining it, the Pope assigned the Polish Archbishop Henryk Hoser a "special mission of the Holy See" with the purpose of exploring the pastoral situation. On 7 May 2015, Pope Francis announced the results would be released soon. On 11 June 2015, the Vatican's chief spokesman communicated that no decision was expected until the Fall of 2015.

Andrea Tornielli of Vatican Insider wrote that the report was viewed with some reservations by the Congregation for the Doctrine of the Faith led by Cardinal Gerhard Ludwig Müller, which expressed doubts regarding the apparitions and the "Ruini report, considered an authoritative contribution to be compared with other opinions and reports." According to eKai, Müller said in April 2017 regarding Medjugorje, "We have to wait a long time for the authenticity of the apparitions in Medjugorje to be confirmed." He pointed out that while Archbishop Hoser is focused on the regulation of the pastoral issues, the Congregation for the Doctrine of the Faith is dealing with the truthfulness of the alleged visions. eKai notes that Müller said that the Congregation examines the "truthfulness of her message so as to present the results of our work to the Holy Father so that he may decide and declare their truthfulness." eKai reports that Müller also said, "we cannot separate the pastoral question from the question of the truthfulness of the apparitions."

According to Sr Bernadette Mary Reis, on 31 May 2018, Pope Francis nominated Archbishop Hoser a second time “as special apostolic visitor for the parish of Medjugorje” with the mandate lasting for “an undefined period..." at the discretion of the Pope. Archbishop Hoser was appointed by Pope Francis to evaluate the quality of pastoral care people were receiving at Medjugorje.

The commission endorsed the end of the ban on pilgrimages organized in Medjugorje. It was recommended by the commission that the town's parish Church of St. James be made a pontifical shrine with Vatican oversight. The Ruini Report was completed in 2014 and was received by Pope Francis.

Position of the popes

Pope John Paul II 

According to the historian Robert Orsi in his book History and Presence, "Our Lady of Medjugorje attracted a vast international following that included many members of the Catholic hierarchy, among them Pope John Paul II." John Paul II in the Roman Catholic tradition, leaves the decision about the Medjugorje apparition to the local clergy. At the same time, it is commonly known that he is sympathetic to the Medjugorje Marian site. The Pope's support for Medjugorje was tacit and served the Vatican's foreign policy reasons during the 1980s. Namely, at that time, the Vatican was providing support to the United States in overthrowing the communist bloc in Eastern Europe.

There are a number of statements attributed to Pope John Paul II regarding the Medjugorje phenomenon. Some of these statements were denied. Joseph Ratzinger, later Pope Benedict XVI, as head of the Congregation for the Doctrine of the Faith, when presented a list of statements, responded, “I can only say that the statements about Medjugorje attributed to the Holy Father and me are mere fabrications." ("frei erfunden") Many other similar claims supportive of the Medjugorje phenomenon were attributed not just to Pope, but many other Church officials, with none of them being proved as authentic. One such claim of Bishop Pavol Hnilica was denied by the Vatican's Secretariat of State.

According to Bishop Peric, both Popes John Paul II and Benedict XVI supported the judgments of the local bishops. The pope's private secretary Stanisław Dziwisz stated that the Pope had entrusted the whole matter to the Congregation for the Doctrine of the Faith and thereafter maintained "a prudent distance." Pope John Paul II allegedly confided in a number of Catholic confidantes about how he felt about Medjugorje. The Vatican has never confirmed those statements.

Christian apologist Patrick Madrid characterizes the witnessing from Medjugorje supporters about how Pope John Paul II favored the authenticity of the apparitions as "apocryphal.”I am not aware of the Holy Father ever publicly commenting, one way or the other, whether verbally or in writing, on Medjugorje....[T]here are numerous instances of private comments alleged to have been made by JPII about Medjugorje, but none that I am aware of which have been verified with documentation, such as video or audio recordings. Peruse these comments, and you’ll see they are all third-hand.

Daniel Klimek in his book, Medjugorje and the Supernatural, notes Slawomir Oder dedicated a section in his book examining John Paul II's devotion to the Medjugorje apparitions. He also wrote that Oder was appointed as the postulator to make the case for the canonization of John Paul II. Oder wrote that he was appointed on May 13, 2005, by Cardinal Camillo Ruini and that his book, Why He is a Saint, recounts the work he did during the process of reviewing the volumes of material gathered and entrusted to him. According to Oder, John Paul II privately confided to others that he felt the events at Medjugorje were genuine.

According to Paul Kengor, in May 1982 Bishop Pavol Hnilica, who was close to Mother Teresa and Pope John Paul II, traveled to Russia with Mother Teresa's confessor and spiritual advisor, Monsignor Leo Maasburg, to be present in Russia, when Pope John Paul II consecrated Russia to the Immaculate Heart of Mary on May 13, 1982. Marie Czernin wrote that when Hnilica returned to Rome, Pope John Paul II met with him and said, among other things, "Medjugorje is the continuation of Fatima, it is the completion of Fatima!" Hnilica was a member of the Secretariat of the "Queen of Peace Committee", along with other prominent supporters of the Medjugorje phenomenon, including Jozo Zovko and Slavko Barbarić.

Antonio Gaspari from Inside the Vatican wrote that the pope said, "If I were not the Pope, I would probably have visited Medjugorje by now."

According to Antonio Gaspari, Cardinal Frantisek Tomasek, Archbishop Emeritus of Prague heard Pope John Paul II state that if he wasn't pope, he would have liked to have been in Medjugorje helping with the pilgrimages.
 	
According to Daniel Klimek, Mirjana Dragicevic, one of the seers, attended a general audience at St. Peter's Basilica in Rome in July 1987 and when John Paul II discovered who she was, he invited her to a private meeting for the following morning at Castel Gandolfo, the pope's private residence. During their conversation, this was what he said regarding Medjugorje: “Please ask the pilgrims in Medjugorje to pray for my intentions. I know all about Medjugorje. I’ve followed the messages from the beginning. Take good care of Medjugorje, Mirjana. Medjugorje is the hope for the entire world. If I were not Pope, I would have gone to Medjugorje a long time ago.” Cardinal Dziwisz said, "I can exclude it in the strongest terms. They say that one of the visionaries, though it isn’t clear if it was Mirjana or Vicka, came one day to the general audience and greeted the Pope as he passed. But he said nothing to her. Otherwise he would have remembered. Besides, the Pope had not even realized who it was."

Marek and Zofia Skwarnicki, personal friends of John Paul II, made available letters he wrote in Polish to them, positively referring to Medjugorje. Klimek wrote that “in one letter, John Paul II directly referenced the presence of the Virgin Mary in Medjugorje.” Denis Nolan points out that John Paul II wrote on the back of a picture of a saint giving to the Skwarnickis: "I thank Zofia for everything concerning Medjugorje. I too go there every day in prayer: I am united with all who are praying there and who receive the call to prayer from there. Today we better understand the summons."

According to journalist Mary Rourke, Jozo Zovko, the Franciscan Pastor during the alleged apparitions, on June 17, 1992, met with John Paul II in Rome during the wars in former Yugoslavia. The pope said regarding Medjugorje, "I give you my blessing. Take courage I am with you. Tell Medjugorje I am with you. Protect Medjugorje. Protect Our Lady's messages.” Rourke also wrote that Zovko said, “the pope shook my hand, very firmly, and said ‘Guard Medjugorje, protect Medjugorje.'"

Antonio Gaspari wrote that during a meeting with the Superior General of the Franciscan Order, the Holy Father asked: "All around Medjugorje bombs have been falling, and yet Medjugorje itself was never damaged. Is this not perhaps a miracle of God?"

Paul Kengor wrote in his book, A Pope and A President that John Paul II said, "If they are converting, praying, fasting, going to confession and doing penance, let them go to Medjugorje."

Pope Benedict XVI (2005–2013) 

Neither Pope Benedict XVI nor the Congregation for the Doctrine of the Faith was considered pro-Medjugorje. During Benedict's pontificate, Vatican officials were generally distrustful of the Franciscans who controlled the seers and promoted Our Lady's alleged messages and apparitions. When Benedict XVI resigned from the papacy, many Medjugorje supporters were relieved.

Like Pope John Paul II, many affirmative statements regarding Medjugorje were attributed to Pope Benedict XVI while he was still a cardinal, which in July 1998, he dismissed as "mere fabrications.”

Bishop Perić visited Rome in 2006 and reported that in his discussion with Pope Benedict XVI regarding the Medjugorje phenomenon, the pope said, "We at the congregation always asked ourselves how can any believer accept as authentic apparitions that occur every day and for so many years?"

In 2009, Pope Benedict XVI laicised the former spiritual director of the alleged seers Tomislav Vlašić.

In 2010, Pope Benedict XVI has set up an international Vatican commission, the Ruini Commission, to study Medjugorje. The work of the commission was difficult from the very beginning due to the disagreement of the members. Some of the key members felt that the commission could not make a decision at all while the alleged apparitions were going on and stopped coming to the commission meetings. However, by the end of Benedict's term, the commission had not completed its work, and its results were inherited by Benedict's successor, Pope Francis.

Pope Francis (2013–present)

In a May 2017 interview, Pope Francis commented on the findings of the commission headed by Cardinal Camillo Ruini, stating that the report said of the initial apparitions that they "need to continue being studied" and expressed doubts in the later apparitions. He also expressed his own suspicion towards the apparitions saying he prefers "the Madonna as Mother, our Mother, and not a woman who's the head of the telegraphic office, who sends a message every day.”

The Rome Reports reported that the Pope said, "there are people who go there and convert, people that find God and their lives change," and "this is a spiritual and pastoral fact that cannot be denied."

Croatian president Zoran Milanović, after meeting the Pope in November 2021, commented that the "commercialisation of Medjugorje is an obstacle to the serious regulation of the status of Medjugorje" and added that "it would be good if Gospa would stop appearing every day".

Pastoral evaluation

In February 2017, Sr. Bernadette Mary Reis of the Vatican News reported that Pope Francis named Polish Archbishop Henryk Hoser as a special envoy to "acquire more in-depth knowledge of the pastoral situation in Medjugorje" and “above all, the needs of the faithful who come to pilgrimage” to “suggest any pastoral initiatives for the future.”

In 2017, around two million people from around eighty countries from all over the world visited Medjugorje. The Archbishop reported his findings to the Pope in the summer of 2017.

On 31 May 2018, Pope Francis nominated Archbishop Hoser a second time as the special envoy, the apostolic visitor, for Medjugorje with the mandate lasting in length at the discretion of the Pope. Archbishop Hoser was appointed by Pope Francis to evaluate the quality of pastoral care people were receiving at Medjugorje. Cindy Wooden of Catholic News Service wrote that the Ruini Commission had recommended that the town's parish Church of St. James be made "a pontifical shrine with Vatican oversight" and lift the ban on pilgrimages, both diocesan and parish. Wooden wrote that Father Perrella said from a pastoral perspective, this would both recognize the devotion, prayer and conversions of the millions who travel to Medjugorje and "ensure that 'a pastor and not a travel agency' is in charge of what happens there".

According to Marshall Connolly of the media company California Network, what Hoser witnessed convinced the archbishop that something genuine has happened. According to Catholic Online, Hoser told the Polish Catholic news agency, KAI, "All indications are that the revelations will be recognized, perhaps even this year." He added, "Specifically, I think it is possible to recognize the authenticity of the first apparitions as proposed by the Ruini commission."

Polish Archbishop Henryk Hoser, the special apostolic visitor for the parish of Medjugorje since February 2017, died on Friday, August 13, 2021, at the Hospital of the Ministry of Interior in Warsaw, Poland. On November 27, 2021, Pope Francis appointed a new apostolic visitor, Archbishop Aldo Cavalli, for the parish of Medjugorje.

Authorization of official pilgrimages

According to Elise Harris, on May 12, 2019, Pope Francis authorized pilgrimages to Medjugorje considering the significant number of people who come to Medjugorje and "the abundant fruits of grace that flow from it." While pilgrimages can now be officially organized by dioceses and parishes, the permission did not address still outstanding doctrinal questions relating to the authenticity of the alleged visions. As a result, the Apostolic Visitor "will have a greater facility—together with the bishops of these places—of establishing relations with the priests who organize these pilgrimages” to ensure that they are “sound and well prepared."
The first sanctioned event was the Thirtieth Annual Youth Festival, which took place from August 1–6, 2019. During the pilgrimage, approximately 50,000 young Catholics from all over the world took part.

Biographies of the assumed seers

Ivanka Ivanković 
Ivanka Ivanković was born in Bijakovići in 1966. At the time of the alleged apparitions, she was 14. Her mother had died in May of that year. She was the first to see the apparition. She, like Ivan Dragičević and Vicka Dragičević, claims that Gospa told her biography between January and May 1983. She claims to have had regular apparitions until May 7, 1985, and that since then the apparitions occur once a year on the anniversary of her first apparition, June 24, 1981. She claims all ten secrets were given to her by Gospa.

She is married to Rajko Elez with whom she has three children. Rajko Elez is one of six sons who owns a local restaurant. They live in Međjugorje.

Mirjana Dragičević Soldo

Mirjana Dragičević Soldo was born in 1965, in Sarajevo. She was 15 at the time of the alleged apparitions. She lived in Sarajevo for some time, where she finished her education. She was the second person to see the Gospa. She claims she had regular apparitions between 24 June 1981, and 25 December 1982. She said that she became depressed when the visions stopped and prayed to see the Gospa again. According to Kutleša, Soldo was given all ten secrets, which are intended "for humanity in general, for the world, then for Međugorje, for Yugoslavia, and some other areas and about the sign". Mirjana said that the Gospa left her a gift that she will see the Gospa on her birthday. According the book Ogledalo Pravde, Soldo said that as of 2 August 1987, "every second day of the month I hear our Lady's voice in me, and sometimes I see her, and with her I pray for the unbelievers". As of 2 January 1997, Soldo knew at what time the Gospa would come - 10 to 11am.

She claims that the apparition told her ten secrets, which are intended "for humanity in general, for the world, then for Međugorje, Yugoslavia, and some other areas". Soldo also said that every seer has a special mission. She was given those who do not know the love of God, Vicka Ivanković and Jakov Čolo for the sick, Ivan Dragičević for the young and the priests, Marija Pavlović for the souls in purgatory, and Ivanka Ivanković for families.

Soldo has been married to Marko Soldo, the nephew of the late Franciscan Father Slavko Barbarić, since 1989 and they have two children. They live in Međugorje, where they own a hotel. They also own a mansion at the Croatian island of Hvar in Sućuraj, which they rent for 25,000 Croatian kunas (equivalent to 3,300 Euros or 3,850 United States dollars) a week. One of her daughters, Veronika, studied at the University of Mostar, and is remembered by her colleagues for arriving at classes in a Range Rover.

Soldo wrote her autobiography titled Moje srce će pobijediti (“My Heart will Triumph”).

On March 18, 2020, Mirjana Dragićević announced that the Blessed Mother would no longer appear to her at that time, the second of each month.

Marija Pavlović Lunetti 

Marija Pavlović Lunetti was born on 1965, in Bijakovići near Međugorje. She finished secondary school in Mostar. To save her brother's life, she donated one of her kidneys. She was 16 at the time of the alleged apparitions of Our Lady, whom she first saw on June 25, 1981. She says she receives daily apparitions, was given nine secrets from the Gospa and receives a message on the 25th of each month for the entire world. These messages were first made public by the Franciscans overseeing the visionaries, Tomislav Vlašić, then after him Slavko Barbarić. She was given the mission to pray for the souls in purgatory.

She is married to Italian Paolo Lunetti with whom she has four children. Even though she lives most of the year in Milan, Italy, she visits Medjugorje often. She was asked by an Italian journalist, why she didn't become a nun, to which she replied that even though she felt drawn to the monastery, she realized that her vocation is about witnessing what she saw and felt. She said that she will be able to seek the way of holiness outside the monastery.

Later, in February 1988, she joined fra Tomislav Vlašić, a New Age promoter, and his group of 15 young men and women in the community "Queen of Peace, - totally yours – Through Mary to Jesus" in Parma, Italy. Rene Laurentin wrote that her joining Vlašić's group was "enthusiastic". Together they participated in spiritual exercises for five months which were completely focused on prayer. Vlašić was an ex-friar since 1987, who with his German assistant, Agnes Heupel, founded a mystic community. Heupel claimed to receive messages from Gospa. Vlašić claimed that through Lunetti's testimony the community was a work of Gospa herself, and that Lunetti had delivered an answer, in March 1987, to his question to Gospa about the community. Vlašić claimed that Lunetti stated: "This is God's plan" and that "Gospa leads the group through father Tomislav and Agnes, through which she sends her messages for the community".

Her friends and family in Medjugorje were alarmed over her compliance, concerned about Vlasic's ambitions. They helped her extricate from the group. She left in July 1988 and denied in writing ever receiving any messages regarding the community from the Gospa. According to Randall Sullivan, in Lunetti's open letter, written after she left the group in July 1988, she stated that Vlašić's claim "absolutely does not correspond to the truth."

Pavlović Lunetti was also a subject to a major embarrassment when she openly publicly endorsed Maria Valtorta's book The Poem of the Man-God. Valltorta's book contains alleged supernatural revelations, designated by the Church authorities as "fraudulent or stemming from a diseased mind". Pavlović Lunetti said that Madonna told her regarding the book that it "can be read... it makes for good reading". Her statements scandalised Catholic theologians.

Vicka Ivanković Mijatović

Vicka Ivanković Mijatović is the oldest of the alleged seers, born in 1964, in Bijakovići, a village near Međugorje. She was 16 at the time of the alleged apparitions. She said she had daily apparitions, and on occasions two, three, four or five times a day. 
Vicka said that the Gospa dictated to her the details of her life on earth from January 1983 to April 1985. It filled up three notebooks. She said she prayed and talked with Our Lady and was given nine secrets. Her prayer mission, given by the Blessed Virgin Mary, is to pray for the sick. Vicka says that her daily apparitions have not yet stopped.

According to Nikola Bulat, who examined Vicka's diaries for the commission, Tomislav Vlašić was the first spiritual guide of the seers and the chronicler of the apparitions. This chronicle covers the period from 11 August 1981 to 15 October 1983. Vicka said that some of her diaries were written by her sister and some she wrote. One of the controversies of the Međugorje phenomenon was her diary about the apparitions, which went public with or without her consent. She claimed that the copying of her diaries occurred without her knowledge or consent.

She married Marijo Mijatović in 2002 and they have two children. The Mijatovićs live in a wall enclosed villa in Krehin Gradac near Medjugorje.

Ivan Dragičević 

Ivan Dragičević was born in Mostar in 1965. He was 15 at the time of the alleged apparitions. After graduating from elementary school, he enrolled at a secondary school in Čitluk, but failed to pass. In August 1981 he applied to the seminary of the Herzegovinian Franciscan Province, where he was already known for the alleged apparitions so he was sent to a seminary in Visoko. In the seminary, he also claimed to have daily apparitions.

While in the Franciscan seminary, he claimed that Gospa came to an image of Jesus and said: "Angel, this is your father". It was written in Ogledalo pravde that such doctrine is nowhere to be found, in the Bible or in Church tradition. Dragičević claimed, like Vicka Dragičević, that the Gospa imparted her biography to him from December 1982 to May 1983. The seers claimed that the Gospa presented Ivan Dragičević to them and conveyed his greetings on 12 November 1981. When Ivan Dragičević appeared to other seers, they saw him "spreading his arms to fly out of joy" and the Madonna told him that she will not appear to him as of 15 November, due to school obligations. He appeared to Vicka and Jakov three days later as well.
Again he failed to pass and was sent to the gymnasium in Dubrovnik, where it was thought he would pass the class more easily. He was unsuccessful there as well and left the school altogether in January 1983.

Dragičević married Laureen Murphy, a former Miss Massachusetts, in 1994. They have four children and live in Boston for six months and then reside for the other half of the year in the parish of Medjugorje. His wife owns a tourist agency for pilgrims to Medjugorje. Dragičević owns a hotel in Medjugorje and a property worth a million of the United States dollars.

In October 2013, Archbishop Gerhard Müller of the Congregation for the Doctrine of the Faith wished the U.S. bishops to be aware that Dragicevic was scheduled to give presentations at parishes across the country and was anticipated to have more apparitions during these talks. According to the Catholic Stand, the Apostolic Nunciature to the United States advised the bishops that the 1991 Zadar declaration that Catholics, whether clergy or laypeople, "are not permitted to participate in meetings, conferences or public celebrations during which the credibility of such 'apparitions' would be taken for granted". The letter was sent to every diocese in the U.S. as the CDF determined that the judgment of the Yugoslavian bishops which precluded such gatherings remained in force.

Jakov Čolo 

Jakov Čolo was born in Bijakovići on March 6, 1971. His father abandoned the family when he was eight years old and his mother died from alcoholism when he was twelve. He was 10 at the time of the alleged apparitions. He claimed to have had daily apparitions from June 25, 1981, to September 12, 1998. As of then, he said that he has one apparition a year on Christmas Day and that the Gospa told him the tenth secret.

He married Annalisa Barozzi, an Italian, in 1993. They have three children and live in Međugorje.

Other alleged seers

Jozo Zovko

Jozo Zovko, the former parish priest of Medjugorje, who was there from the beginning of the visions, was skeptical at first but in time he became the seers preeminent advocate and protector. He allegedly had a vision of Our Lady in a church on 11 April 1983.

Jakov Čolo and Vicka Ivanković claim to have seen an apparition of Zovko on 19 October 1981, while he was on trial at the time. While they prayed, they saw Zovko, who was smiling with the Madonna. Rene Laurentin wrote that Zovko "tells them not to be afraid for him, that everything was well."

The Madonna is said to have appeared to Jakov and Vicka on 21 October 1981. Rene Laurentin wrote that she told them not to worry about Zovko and said that "Jozo looks well and he greets you warmly. Do not fear for Jozo. He is a saint. I have already told you." Rene Laurentin wrote that the apparition told them that the "sentence will not be pronounced this evening. Do not be afraid, he will not be condemned to a severe punishment..." In Vlašić's chronicle, it was written that the apparition told them that the trial will be continued, however, the trial was over that very day, and the sentence was published the day after. Zovko's sentence was reduced to  years in prison. In February 1983 the communists released Zovko after 18 months of hard labor.

Jelena Vasilj

Jelena Vasilj, a young woman from Medjugorje, allegedly also had apparitions of Our Lady on 24 May 1983.

Economic impact
According to Daniel McLaughlin of the Irish Times, although the Yugoslav authorities initially regarded the apparitions as little more than a conspiracy on the part of Croat extremists, gradually "the cash-strapped Yugoslav authorities realized the commercial potential of Medjugorje." Paolo Apolito writes that during the 1980s, Medjugorje was visited by a million pilgrimages on average. The number of visits continued after the end of Bosnian War in 1995.

The popularity of the Medjugorje apparitions turned the local community from a rural to a regional center. Journalist Inés San Martin described Medjugorje as "barely more than a village in 1981, and has since grown to become one big hotel, with restaurants and religious shops being the only commercial activity at hand." San Martin continues, "the holy industry of Medjugorje is in no way unique. From Rome’s St. Peter’s Square to Lourdes, vendors of endless religious articles, from an image of the Virgin to bobbing pope heads are always part of the scenery at any major Catholic venue."
 
Some profits were illegally used to fund the Croat military. One example is a businessman from the United Kingdom who used the money he apparently collected funds for the war orphans, but the money was channeled to the Croat military.

According to the Guardian, in 1997, the Hercegovačka Banka was founded "by several private companies and the Franciscan order, which controls the religious shrine in Medjugorje, a major source of income, both from pilgrims and from donations by Croats living abroad." Located in Mostar, the bank has branches in several towns. In 2001, the bank was investigated for possible ties to Bosnian Croat separatists attempting to forge an independent mini-state in Croat areas of Bosnia. Fra Tomislav Pervan and Fra Ivan Ševan were members of the supervisory board of the bank, along with three former officers of the Croatian Defence Council. According to the Guardian, on April 6, 2001 "masked police, backed by soldiers from the Nato-led Stabilisation Force (S-For), seized control of this bank" and the locals reacted. In the Guardian it was written that "in Mostar the bank's spokesman, Milan Sutalo, called the action 'absolutely illegal because this is a private bank and not a public institution. There was no reason for armed people coming to the bank'." According to Vecernji list BiH, although practically nothing significant was found that could be considered a megacrime according to what foreign-owned banks promoted decades later, the bank was destroyed, as well as a number of its companies, and the money of hundreds of companies and savers was blocked.

In 2016 an Italian was convicted of belonging to a group that was extorting money from foreigners who were escorting pilgrims to the Medjugorje Shrine.

Henryk Hoser, the apostolic visitator in Medjugorje, stated in July 2018 that the mafia had penetrated the pilgrimage site, specifically the Neapolitan mafia – the Camorra. According to the Neapolitan newspaper Il Mattino in Naples, magistrates are investigating Camorra ties to a pilgrimage business, three hotels, guide services, and souvenir vendors in Medjugorje.

Effects of the coronavirus to the town of Medjugorje
On March 20, 2020, the Associated Press presented a video of the empty streets in Medjugorje, writing that the locals now "fear international and Europe wide travel restrictions and anxiety about the coronavirus pandemic will lead to a dramatic fall in visitors and damage their livelihoods."

On June 25, 2020, Reuters reported that the travel restrictions had caused a marked decrease in pilgrimages, down from over 100,000 per year, along with a loss in revenue for local businesses.

Croat nationalism
Medjugorje is a town located in Bosnia and Herzegovina, about 20 km (12 mi) east of the border with Croatia in an overwhelmingly ethnically Croatian area. Slavenka Drakulic, a Croatian writer, wrote that in "Croatia, religion means nation and nation means religion." She continues, “in our last census, over 90% of Croatians said they are Catholic. Not necessarily because they are believers but as a way of saying, ‘We are not Serbs.’ So, Medjugorje has a symbolic meaning. It is part of Croatia's identity as a Catholic country.” According to Mary Rourke of the Los Angeles Times, perhaps the most cynical explanation of the Medjugorje phenomenon suggests that the Croatians, virtually all of them baptized Catholics, have used it for political and national ends. Professor Chris Merrill noted, "Whether the apparitions actually happened or not, they have become part of the building of a national identity."

The Herzegovina Franciscans favored a separate Croat state over an independent Bosnia and Herzegovina and supported the Croatian Nationalists fighting the Bozniak Muslims. The end of the Bosnian War did not end calls for Croatian autonomy in western Bosnia. Henning Philipp, a spokesperson for the Organization for Security and Cooperation in Europe (OSCE) said that the creation of a Croatian entity in Bosnia was not in accordance with the Dayton Agreement that ended the war. In April 2001, the NATO-led Stabilisation Force closed and searched local branches of the Hercegovačka banka ("Herzegovina Bank") of which the Franciscan Province was a shareholder of the bank. This bank handled a large part of the currency transactions in Herzegovina, including international donations intended for Međugorje. This crackdown was based on suspicions of white-collar crime and funneling money to the ultra-nationalist party, the Croat Democratic Union (HDZ) in order to finance arms purchases for Croatian separatists in Herzegovina. On January 23, 2004, the Bosnian-Croatian politicians Miroslav Prce and Ante Jelavić as well as the businessman Miroslav Rupcić were arrested on suspicion of embezzling deposits from the bank. The pastor of the Medjugorje parish, dismissed the idea of a connection between the shrine and the HDZ.

On the one hand, villagers complained about the international administration of Bosnia. They said that foreigners imposed a federation with Muslims and their powerful armies on us. Arie Farnam, journalist, said that this villager continued, "No one asked us what we think. They banned our elected representatives and put people of their own choosing in our government." Farnam also noted that an alternative view is that the "HDZ's actions is defending its political and economic stronghold around the lucrative Medjugorje site."

Reactions

Skepticism 

Two former bishops of the Diocese of Mostar-Duvno, Pavao Žanić and Ratko Perić, have stated that they believe that the apparitions are a hoax. Antonio Gaspari wrote that in the beginning, Zanic was supportive to the young seers, but subsequently changed his mind and became "the main critic and opponent of the Medjugorje apparitions."

Marian expert Donal Foley says that, “sadly, the only rational conclusion about Medjugorje is that it has turned out to be a vast, if captivating, religious illusion”. Foley attributed the popularity of the Medjugorje cult to the fact that Medjugorje may appeal to Catholics confused by changes after the Second Vatican Council.

Critics such as Catholic author E. Michael Jones consider the apparitions to be a hoax, and have stated that the reports of mysterious lights on the hill could easily be explained by illusions produced by atmospheric conditions, or fires that were lit by local youths. According to Chris Maunder in his book Our Lady of the Nations, the author E. Michael Jones is antagonistic towards Medjugorje, is not objective, and "presents a conspiracy theory rather than a thorough analysis."

Raymond Eve, a professor of sociology, in the Skeptical Inquirer has written:
I acknowledge that the teenagers' initial encounters with the Virgin may well have been caused by personal factors. For example, Ivanka, who was the first to perceive a visitation, had just lost her natural mother. The perception of apparitional experiences spread rapidly among her intimate peer group. ...The region's tension and anxiety likely exacerbated this contagion process and the need to believe among the youthful protagonists.

Skeptical investigator Joe Nickell has noted that there are a number of reasons for doubting the authenticity of the apparitions such as contradictions in the stories. For example, on the first sighting, the teenagers claimed they had visited Podbrdo Hill to smoke. They later retracted this, claiming they had gone to the hill to pick flowers. According to Nickell there is also a problem of the "embarrassingly illiterate" nature of the messages.

Supporters

Archbishop Franic of Split, a senior Croatian cleric, in 1985, during the Yugoslav episcopal conference, supported the Medjugorje apparitions and opposed Zanic.

According to Inés San Martín, Hans Urs von Balthasar, said: “The theology of Medjugorje rings true. I am convinced of its truth. Everything concerning Medjugorje is authentic from a Catholic point of view.” Chris Maunder wrote that the theologian, Hans Urs von Balthasar condemned Bishop Zanic for "his uncompromising style when making accusations against Medjugorje's supporters."

Chris Maunder noted that Mariologist René Laurentin, who was a priest and theologian, authored books that were positive about Our Lady of Medjugorje, such as: Is the Virgin Mary Appearing in Medjugore?, An Urgent Message for the World given in a Marxist Country (1984), Scientific and Medical Studies on the Apparitions at Medjugorje (1987) and a series of books to update supporters called Derniers Nouvelles (Latest News). Joanne Marie Greer and David O.Moberg have explained that Laurentin and co-author Henry Joyeux, a medical doctor and professor at the University of Montpellier, used the results from scientific tests “carried out on the visionaries, both during their normal life and while in ecstasy” and found these tests “to be a most powerful argument in defense of the apparitions.”

Cardinal Cristoph Schönborn of Austria, a close collaborator of Pope Francis, took a personal pilgrimage to Medjugorje in 2009. According to John Thavis, Schönborns pilgrimage was "highly publicized where he spoke favorably about the apparitions and met with at least one of the visionaries."

Locations of alleged visions outside of Medjugorje
Medjugorje is where the alleged visions began in 1981, and are claimed to be still occurring. Some visionaries, when traveling or moved, reported having visions in other locations. Here is a list of some of them:

 Bosnia and Herzegovina: Mostar, Sarajevo, Visoko (Ivan Dragičević in high school),
 Croatia: Zagreb, Varaždin, Dubrovnik Seminary (Ivan Dragičević), 
 United States: Boston, Massachusetts, Birmingham, Alabama,
 Italy: Milan, Monza
 Switzerland

See also 

 List of Marian apparitions
 Marian apparition
 Our Lady of Fátima
 Our Lady of Lourdes
 Radio Maria
 Visions of Jesus and Mary

Footnotes

References

Books

Journals and magazines

News articles

Websites

External links

 Shrine of Our Lady of Medjugorje – Official Website 
 Mary TV – Live streams from Medjugorje 

Catholic pilgrimage sites
Catholic Church in Bosnia and Herzegovina
Čitluk, Bosnia and Herzegovina
Marian apparitions